Huberht Taylor Hudson (17 September 1886 – 15 June 1942), commonly known as Hubert Hudson instead of by his actual first name (an Old English version of the name), was a navigating officer in the British Royal Navy, who took part in Ernest Shackleton's Imperial Trans-Antarctic Expedition to Antarctica.

Hudson joined the expedition whilst a 'mate' in the Royal Navy. He earned the nickname of 'Buddha', when the rest of the crew successfully tricked him into dressing-up in little more than a bedsheet for a 'fancy dress' party on the whaling station at South Georgia. Hudson was described as a "young dandy" who was somewhat self-centered and a poor listener, "simple and a little irritating....a little impressed with his own good looks, but really not too sure of himself."

During the expedition, Hudson was famed for his ability to catch penguins, which the crew used as a source of food whilst trapped on the ice. Hudson would be put in charge of steering the tiller of one of the lifeboats, the Stancomb Wills, once the crew escaped from the pack ice, eventually landing on Elephant Island. Towards the end of the expedition, Hudson suffered a severe breakdown of mental morale, possibly due to a massive boil that he developed on his buttocks. His illness caused Frank Wild, the second-in-command, a lot of worry that he would not survive. However, Hudson pulled through and eventually recovered his health.

Upon return from the expedition, Hudson took part in World War I, serving on Q-ships.

He later also took part in World War II as a Royal Navy Reserve Convoy Commodore.

Notes 

Explorers of Antarctica
Imperial Trans-Antarctic Expedition
Royal Navy officers of World War I
1886 births
1942 deaths
Royal Navy officers of World War II
Royal Naval Volunteer Reserve personnel of World War II
Royal Navy personnel killed in World War II
Military personnel from London
People from Holloway, London